The London Monster was the name given to an alleged attacker of women in London between 1788 and 1790.  The attacker had a signature behaviour of piquerism, the pricking or stabbing of victims with a knife, pin or needle.

History
The first reports of the Monster appeared in 1788. According to the victims (most of them from wealthier families), a large man had followed them, shouted obscenities and stabbed them in the buttocks. Some reports claimed an attacker had knives fastened to his knees. Other accounts reported that he would invite prospective victims to smell a fake nosegay and then stab them in the face with the spike hiding within the flowers.

In all cases the alleged assailant would escape before help arrived. Some women were found with their clothes cut and others had substantial wounds. In two years the number of reported victims amounted to more than 50.

The press soon named the maniac The Monster. Descriptions of the attacker varied greatly. Some men even founded a No Monster Club and began to wear club badges on their lapels to show that they were not the Monster.

Londoners were outraged when the Bow Street Runners, the London police force, failed to capture the man. Philanthropist John Julius Angerstein promised a reward of £100 for capture of the perpetrator. Armed vigilantes began to patrol in the city. Fashionable ladies began to wear copper pans over their petticoats. There were false accusations and attacks against suspicious people. Local pickpockets and other criminals used the panic to their advantage; they picked someone's valuables, pointed at him, shouted "Monster!", and escaped during the resulting mayhem.

Arrest of Rhynwick Williams

On 13 June 1790, Anne Porter claimed she had spotted her attacker in St. James's Park. Her lover, John Coleman, began a slow pursuit of the man, who realised he was being followed. When Rhynwick Williams, a 23-year-old florist, reached his house, Coleman confronted him, accusing him of insulting a lady, and challenged him to a duel. He eventually took Williams to meet Porter, who fainted when she saw him.

Williams protested his innocence but, given the climate of panic, it was futile. He admitted that he had once approached Porter but had an alibi for another of the attacks. Magistrates charged Williams with defacing clothing—a crime that in the Bloody Code carried a harsher penalty than assault or attempted murder. During the trial, spectators cheered the witnesses for the prosecution and insulted those for the defence. One of the claimed victims confessed that she had not been attacked at all.

The court granted Williams a retrial. In the new trial Williams' defence lawyer was Irish poet Theophilus Swift, whose tactic was to accuse Porter of a scheme to collect the reward, Porter having married Coleman, who had received the reward money. Despite the fact that a number of alleged victims gave contradictory stories and that his employer and co-workers testified that he had an alibi for the most infamous attack, Williams was convicted on three counts and sentenced to two years each, for a total of six years in prison. He was released in December 1796.

Historians have speculated whether Williams was the culprit and have even questioned whether the London Monster existed at all. Reports of Monster-like attacks continued to be reported for many years, although they lessened somewhat while Williams was imprisoned.

Due to the likelihood that several attackers emulated the original attacker, the London Monster is regarded as possibly one of the first copycat cases. It has also been compared to Jack the Ripper, who murdered several prostitutes in London a century later and also received a similar media coverage and press sensationalism.

See also
 Garrow's Law (episode 2 of this TV series had its plot based on the London Monster case)
 Halifax Slasher, a similar incident in 1938 in Halifax, West Yorkshire
 Jack the Ripper
 Mad Gasser of Mattoon
 Spring-heeled Jack
 Thames Torso Murders
 Whipping Tom

Notes

References
Jan Bondeson — The London Monster: A Sanguinary Tale (2000) 
William Oldnall Russell - Treatise on crimes and indictable misdemeanours Vol 1 p620-621 (1826) ISBN (none)
The 'monster' that terrified Georgian London - BBC Reel

External links
Old Bailey Proceedings, 8 July 1790
Renwick Williams in the Newgate Calendar

1780s in London
1788 crimes in Europe
18th-century English criminals
Year of death missing
Year of birth missing
English male criminals
London crime history
People whose existence is disputed
Women in London